Conor Mitchell is a Northern Irish composer, librettist and theatre-maker.

His play, The Dummy Tree, was commissioned by the Royal National Theatre for their 2009 New Connections series.

Conor has been a great supporter of Youth Music Theatre UK and has received several commissions from them including Missing Mel, Goblin Market, Eight, The Dark Tower and Barrack Room Ballads.

He split first place in the Stephen Sondheim Society's Student Performer of the Year Competition for a song he wrote entitled What Kind of Life Is This, Masha?. He split the new song competition prize with Gwenyth Herbert's Lovely London Town.

In 2012, he was commissioned by the London Gay Men's Chorus for a piece to mark the choir's 21st anniversary. With book written by Mark Ravenhill, the piece, entitled Shadow Time, explores the evolution of mentalities in respect of homosexuality in the lifetime of the Chorus. The piece will be premiered at the Royal Festival Hall, on 6 May 2012 during the Chorus' summer concert: A Band of Brothers.

Works

Music theatre
 Have a Nice Life
 Goblin Market based on Christina Rossetti's poem Goblin Market
 Matilde based on Guy de Maupassant's story, "La Parure" (The Necklace).
 Merry Christmas Betty Ford
 The Dummy Tree For the National Theatre's Connections festival.
 Ten Plagues - A Song Cycle (2011, text by Mark Ravenhill)
The C**t of Queen Catherine - a recitation for actor and ensemble,(2016) first performed by The Belfast Ensemble at the MAC, Belfast.
The Young Pornographers

Opera

 The Musician
 Our Day (2012) a short opera. Libretto by Mark Ravenhill
 Abomination - A DUP Opera (2018)

Film

 Pretty Face

References

External links
Connor Mitchell biography on the Youth Music Theatre UK web site

Irish composers
Living people
Year of birth missing (living people)